Christie Malry's Own Double-Entry (1973) is the penultimate novel by the late British avant-garde novelist B. S. Johnson. It is the metafictional account of a disaffected young man, Christie Malry, who applies the principles of double-entry bookkeeping to his own life, "crediting" himself against society in an increasingly violent manner for perceived "debits".

Plot summary
Christie Malry, being a "simple man", above all longs for sex and money. In order to understand how money works, he takes a job in a London bank. This leads him to enroll in a bookkeeping course, where he learns the double-entry system. Bored by his bank job, he quits and starts work at Tapper's, a sweet factory.

One day, he has the idea to apply the double-entry system to his life. Every aggravation Malry suffers from society—such as being forced to walk along a particular stretch of pavement due to a building's placement—is revenged by a recompense—in this case, "[scratching] an unsightly line about a yard long into the blackened portland stone facing of the office block" (23–4). Having established this system, and growing progressively more angry at society, Malry graduates from minor acts of personal revenge (mostly vandalism) to large-scale terrorism: bombing hoaxes, an actual bombing, and poisoning West London's drinking water. Shortly before he manages to bomb the House of Commons, he dies of cancer.

Christie compares himself to "Guy Fawkes, with the difference that he was caught" and strictly follows a code of twelve principles. The first principle, "I am a cell of one" (89), forbids him from discussing his actions with anyone else, not even with his few friends or with the Shrike, his beloved girlfriend.

Metafictional elements
Johnson scatters many metafictional elements throughout the novel, often for comedic effect. Characters frequently mention in passing that they know that they are works of fiction, such as when Malry's mother says to him that she has been his mother for the purposes of the novel (27), or when Christie complains that the novel contains too many exclamation marks (166). Johnson also frequently emphasizes the written, and thereby invented, nature of the text. Following Malry's poisoning of a reservoir, Johnson writes:

A total of just over twenty thousand people died of cyanide poisoning that morning. This was the first figure that came to hand as it is roughly the number of words of which the novel consists so far.

Be assured there are not many more, neither deaths nor words. (147)

Johnson introduces himself as a character near the novel's end, apologising to Christie that he won't be able to continue the book much further—to which Christie replies that people don't equate length with importance, and that readers no longer want long novels (165). Johnson delays his description of Christie until the sixth chapter, where he provides a description "with diffidence," fearing that the reader will simply ignore it, or disagree:

What writer can compete with the reader's imagination!

Christie is therefore an average shape, height, weight, build, and colour. Make him what you will: probably in the image of yourself. You are allowed complete freedom in the matter of warts and moles; as long as he has at least one of either. (51)

Publication history
Christie Malry's Own Double-Entry was first published in 1973 by William Collins, Sons and Co. Ltd. It has since then been reprinted twice by New Directions, in 1985 and 2009 respectively. A 2001 edition with a foreword by John Lanchester was published by Pan Macmillan (Picador (imprint)).

Radio adaptation
In January 1973, the book was adapted for radio and broadcast on BBC Radio London. This version was read by the author with dramatised sections.

Film version

In 2000, a film adaptation was produced.  It was directed by Paul Tickell, written by Simon Bent and starred Nick Moran as Christie.

References

External links
Interview with Paul Tickell, director of Christie Malry's Own Double Entry

1973 British novels
British novels adapted into films
English novels
Novels about terrorism
William Collins, Sons books